Upper Waitohi is a small rural community in the Timaru District, New Zealand. It is located north of Pleasant Point and north-west of Temuka. A monument dedicated to pioneer aviator Richard Pearse is located in the area.

References

Timaru District
Populated places in Canterbury, New Zealand